Surveillance tools are all means technological provided and used by the surveillance industry, police or military intelligence, and national security institutions that enable individual surveillance and mass surveillance.
Steven Ashley in 2008 listed the following components used for surveillance:
Primarily electronic
Digital still and video cameras (CCTVs)
GPSs for tracking
Electronic toll takers
Computer surveillance
Phone tapping
Cell phone monitoring 
Voice, facial features, walking gait and other biometric characteristics
Covert listening devices or "bugs", tiny, hidden microphone and short-range radio transmitter
directional microphones
primarily chemical
Artificial noses
Chemical markers like UV markers
DNA sensors: Biochip etc., for screening tiniest traces of body material 
Other
Airplanes, unmanned aerial vehicles and satellites
Night-vision goggles or telescopes
Laser beam bounced off a window to record vibrations in the pane from conversations in the room
Discarded items containing personal information, like
phone bills,
credit-card statements and
computer hard drives (using digital forensics)
The electronic means, especially when combined with Internet features (ubiquitous computing, IoT) and enhanced by artificial intelligence analysis methods readily lend themselves to mass surveillance. This is why countersurveillance measures like anonymization and end-to-end encryption have become critical. Devices like chemical markers, on the other hand are more suited and in fact designed mainly for monitoring individuals.

See also
Global surveillance disclosures (2013–present)
List of government mass surveillance projects
National Applications Office
Surveillance Detection Unit

References

External links
 pdf
 

Mass surveillance
Mass surveillance industry